Renata C. Roberts-Tenana (born 9 August 1993) is a New Zealand rugby union player who plays for Old Glory DC of Major League Rugby (MLR). His position is Wing or Fullback.

Professional career
Roberts-Tenana signed for Major League Rugby side Old Glory DC ahead of the 2020 Major League Rugby season. He had previously represented  in 2 seasons of the Mitre 10 Cup. He returned to  during the 2021 Bunnings NPC.

References

External links
itsrugby.co.uk Profile
Old Glory DC profile

1993 births
Living people
New Zealand rugby union players
Northland rugby union players
Old Glory DC players
Rugby union fullbacks
Rugby union players from Ruatoria
Rugby union wings